The 2000 Pacific Curling Championships were held from November 8 to 11 in Esquimalt, British Columbia, Canada. 

New Zealand's Dan Mustapic won the men's event over Australia's Hugh Millikin (it was the second Pacific title for the New Zealand men's team and the first title for skip Dan Mustapic). On the women's side, Japan's Yukari Okazaki defeated South Korea's Kim Mi-yeon in the final (it was the ninth Pacific title for the Japanese women).   

By virtue of winning, the New Zealand men's team and the Japanese women's team qualified for the 2001 World  and  Curling Championships in Lausanne, Switzerland.

It was Australia's turn to host the championships, but due to the lack of dedicated curling ice in the country, it was decided to host the event in Canada instead. When Australia previously hosted the event, it was held in ice hockey arenas. Doing so again would have cost $45,000 (Canadian), while having the event in Esquimalt only costed $7,000.

Men

Teams

Round Robin

 Teams to playoffs

Playoffs

Semifinal

Final

Final standings

Women

Teams

Round Robin

 Teams to playoffs

Playoffs

Final standings

References

External links

Pacific Curling Championships, 2000
Pacific-Asia Curling Championships
International curling competitions hosted by Canada
2000 in Canadian curling
Curling in British Columbia
November 2000 sports events in Canada